A bottle cap or bottle top is a closure for the top opening of a bottle. A cap is sometimes colorfully decorated with the logo of the brand of contents. Plastic caps are used for plastic bottles, while metal with plastic backing is used for glass; plastic caps are commonly made from polyethylene or polypropylene, while metal caps are usually either steel or aluminum. Plastic caps may have a pour spout. Flip-Top caps like Flapper closures provide controlled dispensing of dry products. Caps for plastic bottles are often made of a different type of plastic from the bottle.

A cork is another type of closure for the top of a bottle.

Types 
Caps were originally designed to be pressed over and around the top of a glass bottle to grab a small flange on the bottleneck.

Crown cork 

The crown cork was patented by William Painter on February 2, 1892 (U.S. Patent 468,258). It had 24 teeth and a cork seal with a paper backing to prevent contact between the contents and the metal cap. The current version has 21 teeth. To open these bottles, a bottle opener is generally used.

The height of the crown cap was reduced and specified in the German standard DIN 6099 in the 1960s. This also defined the "twist-off" crown cap, now used in the United States, Canada, and Australia. This cap is pressed around screw threads instead of a flange and can be removed by twisting the cap by hand, eliminating the need for an opener.

Flip-top 

The "flip-top", "swing-top" or "Grolsch" style consists of a plastic or ceramic stopper held in place by a set of wires. Prior to the invention of the crown cork, this was the dominant method of sealing bottles that contained carbonated liquid.

Other types

Screw cap 

Screw on closures are the most common bottle caps. They are easy to apply by a wide variety of automated equipment, or they can be applied by hand.
The application torque of closures, however, must be controlled in order for the closures to perform properly in the field. Closures must be applied tight enough to maintain a seal and to resist closure back-off, but must not be applied so tightly that the end user cannot remove the closure.  They are often found on top of beers, such as Coors or Bud Light.

Screw caps were originally an internal thread design. A glass bottle/jar with an internal screw-thread immediately below a gasket-seat, having a beveled seat, was patented by Hyman (Himan) Frank of the William Frank & Sons, Inc. of Pittsburgh, PA. He was awarded patent US 130208 A on August 6, 1872.

Closure lining materials

Foamed polyethylene (F217)
Commonly used with plastic screw caps. F-217 is a soft polyethylene foam core covered on top and bottom with solid, clear polyethylene supplied in 0.050-inch thickness. F217 has become the industry standard due to its all-purpose compatibility, resilient, compressible seal, cleanliness (no pulp dust) and economy. F217 liners have excellent chemical resistance and a low moisture transmission rate. F217 has good taste and odor resistance.

Plastisol
Plastisol is the standard lining material used in metal closures for vacuum packing glass bottles and jars. Plastisol is a flowed-in compound, usually a dispersion of PVC resins in plasticizers. It forms a solid, self-bonding, sealing gasket in the closures. Plastisol liners are used in metal twist-off and metal continuous thread screw caps for use on hot-pack food products where the preservation of a vacuum is essential.

Pressure-sensitive liners (PS 22)
Styrene foam material coated on the down-facing side with torque-activated adhesive. Pressure-sensitive inner seals adhere to plastic or glass bottles with normal application torque. Pressures sensitive liners are supplied pressed into closures and adhere to the bottle finish when the closure is applied. Pressure-sensitive liners stick to the container because one side is coated with pockets of adhesive. When the closure is applied to the container, the pockets of adhesive rupture between the closure and finish of bottle or jar. The pressure-sensitive liners then stick to the bottle or jar and remain in place when the closure is removed. No extra equipment is required. The closures are supplied with a standard liner as a backing. This material needs a dry land area on the bottle and therefore is suitable only for use with dry products such as vitamins, foods and pharmaceuticals.

Polyseal cone liners
Molded in Low-Density Polyethylene, Polyseal cone liners form to the inside of the bottleneck providing a leakproof seal which guards against back-off and product evaporation. Excellent for use with acid products and essential oils, these closures are recommended for use on glass bottles only.

Linerless designs – land seal (crab’s claw)
A popular general purpose linerless sealing mechanism which can be used on most all bottles. The design typically features a 0.045” molded inner flange which when applied with normal application torque compresses to approximately one-half of its thickness while sealing against the bottle lip. The liner creates a watertight seal with a bottle having a minimum 0.065” wide sealing surface which is free of nicks, burrs or irregularities. This style linerless mechanism is available in popular dispensing caps, and has the advantage of being simpler & cheaper to manufacture.

Promotional use 
Soda companies particularly use caps for promotion. A message is printed on the inside of the cap and people with the right message may win a prize. Since the bottle must be purchased to determine the message and win, people usually purchase more of the drink to increase their chances of winning. Some companies print interesting facts, riddles or games on the inside of caps.

A long-running promotion by the Coca-Cola company was the MyCokeRewards program started in 2006; most caps have an alphanumeric code that can be input to their website in return for points.

In popular culture

One of the more prominent uses of the conventional metal bottle cap in popular culture is its use in the Fallout series of video games. In the series' post-apocalyptic world, bottle caps, usually shortened simply to "caps", have been widely adopted as a de facto currency. Although official currencies are used by some of the more developed factions, caps are essentially a universal medium of trade across the wasteland, to the point that the discovery of a working bottle cap press threatens to destabilize the economy.

See also 
 Beverage can
 Bottle Tops
 Closure (container)
 GPI standards for container finishes which includes bottle caps
 Tamper resistant and tamper-evident

References

Further reading
  — Improvement in bottle-stoppers.
 * Yam, K. L., Encyclopedia of Packaging Technology. John Wiley & Sons, 2009. .
  — Bottle sealing device.
  — Combined metallic cap and fastener.

External links 

 Closure Application Torque
 

Bottles
Packaging
Food packaging